Nicholas Andrew Selwyn Lezard is an English journalist, author and literary critic.

Background and education
The Lezard family went from London to Kimberley, Northern Cape, South Africa, in the 1800s. Nicholas Lezard's great-grandfather, Louis Flavien Lezard (1877–1960), of Hallam Street in central London, became a noted solicitor (senior partner, Lezard, Robins and Edmeades) and local figure in the country, serving as chairman and president of several Kimberley institutions. Louis's eldest son, Julien (1902–1958) – the third son, Squadron Leader Selwyn Edward Lezard (1908–1974), R.A.F.V.R., being Nicholas Lezard's grandfather – was a Cambridge-educated barrister and noted society figure and gambler, who served in the Special Operations Executive alongside Xan Fielding. Julien Lezard married Hilda, daughter of Sir Daniel Cooper, 2nd Baronet; she was the widow of Thomas Uchter Caulfield Knox, Viscount Northland, son of Uchter Knox, 5th Earl of Ranfurly, and of Geoffrey Edward Mills, son of Charles Mills, 1st Baron Hillingdon.

He was educated at The Hall School, Hampstead, Westminster School, and Trinity College, Cambridge (BA 1984, MA 1990).

Career
He has a weekly column, 'Nicholas Lezard's choice', reviewing paperback books for The Guardian. He also writes for The Independent, and contributes the 'Down and Out' column for the New Statesman. His book The Nolympics: One Man's Struggle Against Sporting Hysteria was published in 2012 by Penguin Books. Lezard's memoir, Bitter Experience Has Taught Me, about his life after a marriage ended, was published in 2013.

References

External links
 
Nicholas Lezard at journalisted

Year of birth missing (living people)
Living people
English male journalists
English literary critics
The Guardian journalists
The Independent people
New Statesman people
People educated at The Hall School, Hampstead
People educated at Westminster School, London
Alumni of Trinity College, Cambridge